Jarvis Bay is a summer village in Alberta, Canada. It is located on the eastern shore of Sylvan Lake south of Jarvis Bay Provincial Park.

Demographics 

In the 2016 Census of Population conducted by Statistics Canada, the Summer Village of Jarvis Bay had a population of 213 living in 86 of its 136 total private dwellings, a  change from its 2011 population of 203.

See also 
List of communities in Alberta
List of summer villages in Alberta
List of resort villages in Saskatchewan

References

External links 

1986 establishments in Alberta
Summer villages in Alberta